Oleg Ivanovich Mekhov (born 2 June 1966) is a former Russian professional footballer.

External links
 

1966 births
Living people
Soviet footballers
Russian footballers
Russian expatriate footballers
Expatriate footballers in Ukraine
Expatriate footballers in Kazakhstan
Expatriate footballers in Germany
Expatriate footballers in Hong Kong
Ukrainian Premier League players
FC Asmaral Moscow players
FC Tobol Kurgan players
NK Veres Rivne players
Happy Valley AA players
FC Shakhter Karagandy players
FC Dynamo Moscow reserves players
Association football forwards